John Starling was elected Member of Parliament for the Ipswich in 1413.

John was a wealthy butcher, who reared animals himself on pasture he owned or rented. He was a bailiff for the Ipswich Corporation several times: 1404-05, 1407-8, 1412-3, 1416-7.

References

14th-century births
15th-century deaths
Members of the Parliament of England (pre-1707) for Ipswich